Harry Frederick Whitchurch  (22 September 1866 – 16 August 1907) was an English recipient of the Victoria Cross, the highest and most prestigious award for gallantry in the face of the enemy that can be awarded to British and Commonwealth forces.

Whitchurch was 28 years old, and a surgeon captain in the Indian Medical Service, Indian Army during the Chitral Expedition of 1895 of 1895 when, on 3 March, the following deed took place for which he was awarded the VC.

Further information
He later achieved the rank of surgeon major and died from enteric fever.

The Medal
His VC is on display at the Lord Ashcroft collection in the Imperial War Museum, Chelsea, London.

References

Monuments to Courage (David Harvey, 1999)
The Register of the Victoria Cross (This England, 1997)

External links
Major H.F. Whitchurch

1866 births
1907 deaths
British recipients of the Victoria Cross
Indian Medical Service officers
British military personnel of the Chitral Expedition
People from Kensington
Infectious disease deaths in India
Deaths from typhoid fever
British military personnel of the Boxer Rebellion
British military personnel of the Lushai Expedition
British military personnel of the Malakand Frontier War